The Sower is a public art work by artist Gustav Bohland, located on the south side of Milwaukee, Wisconsin. The bronze sculpture depicts an agricultural worker dressed in overalls and carrying a seed bag. The figure's shirt sleeves are rolled up past his elbows and the wide brim of a hat shades his face. His shirt collar is open. One hand holds the seed bag against his hip, and the other hand is cupped and extended in a gesture of scattering seeds. His boots rest on a small round base mounted on a circular flagstone pedestal. The artwork is located at the former corporate headquarters of Froedtert Malting Company which is now the US headquarters for MaltEurop.

See also
 Bird and Fish
 The Reaper

References

1952 establishments in Wisconsin
1952 sculptures
Bronze sculptures in Wisconsin
Outdoor sculptures in Milwaukee
Sculptures of men in Wisconsin
Statues in Wisconsin